Stefanija Statkuvienė (born September 5, 1962 in Kuršėnai, Lithuania) is a retired female long-distance runner from Lithuania. She competed for her native Baltic country in the women's marathon event at the 1996 Summer Olympics in Atlanta, Georgia, finishing in 40th place (2:39.51).  Statkuvienė set her personal best in the women's classic distance in 1995, clocking 2:28.11.

Achievements
All results regarding marathon, unless stated otherwise

See also
 Lithuanian records in athletics

References

1962 births
Living people
Lithuanian female long-distance runners
Belgian female long-distance runners
Athletes (track and field) at the 1996 Summer Olympics
Olympic athletes of Lithuania